Fantasia International Film Festival (also known as Fantasia-fest, FanTasia, and Fant-Asia) is a film festival that has been based mainly in Montreal since its founding in 1996. Regularly held in July of each year, it is valued by both hardcore genre film fans, and distributors, who take advantage of the eclectic line up to select domestic and international films for release across North America. By virtue of the reputation developed over the last 15 years, this festival has been described as perhaps the "most outstanding and largest genre film festival in North America".

Overview
The history of the Fantasia Festival has roots in the Asian Film scene in Montreal. Beginning in 1996 where it screened Asian films from Hong Kong and Anime from Japan, the festival later expanded its international repertoire and screened genre films from all across the world. Since this time many world and international premieres have featured at Fantasia fest, including Shaun of the Dead, Perfect Blue, Millennium Actress, Midnight Meat Train, Dread, The Sorcerer's Apprentice and Uzumaki.

Among the many North American premieres have included Ringu, Inglourious Basterds, Thirst, We Are What We Are, Visitor Q and Night Watch.

The organizers present a number of awards at the conclusion of each annual festival, including the Barry Convex Award for best Canadian film premiering at the festival.

History

1996–2010
Fant-Asia 1996 (inaugural festival)
Fant-Asia 1997
Some of the films featured were Perfect Blue, Drunken Master II, Stagefright, El Dia de la Bestia, Henry, A Gun for Jennifer, Tromeo and Juliet and Cutting Moments.

Fant-Asia 1998
Fantasia's Toronto edition premiered at the Bloor Cinema.

Fantasia International Film Festival 1999
The 1999 edition of Fantasia was the only one that used the ex-Centris facilities. This year also featured the second Toronto edition.

FanTasia 2000
The 2000 edition of Fantasia featured the debut of the Just For Laughs film festival, Comedia, as a selection of comedy films were shown with the regular Fantasia fare. This was also the final year that a Toronto edition of the festival was presented.

FanTasia 2001
The 2001 edition was the last held in the Imperial Cinema. It was also the last time the festival was jointly held with Comedia.

FanTasia 2002 (missed year)
Fantasia 2002 was cancelled due to problems with the Imperial Cinema. The air conditioning system was broken, and it could not be fixed in time for Fantasia. Indeed, the theatre was not repaired until 2004. Due to the lack of assurance that the theater would be available, and the fact that it broke four months before the festival, meant that alternate bookings were not available. The lack of assurance for the 2003 festival meant a change in venue.

FanTasia 2003 (move to Concordia University)
Fantasia 2003 was held for the first time on the Concordia University campus, using the de Sève Cinema and Henry F. Hall Alumni Auditorium. The venue change was instigated by the lack of consideration that the Imperial Theatre gave in informing the festival organizers on the status of Imperial. This was also the first year that a DVD filled with movie trailers of movies shown at the festival was available for purchase with the festival guide book.

Fantasia 2004
The 2004 Fantasia was held at Concordia University using the Hall Auditorium and deSeve Cinema. Unlike the 2003 event, no DVD filled with trailers was available.

Fantasia 2005
The 9th annual Fantasia Festival in 2005 was again held at Concordia University. That year, a trailer-filled DVD was provided as part of the festival guide book and not a separate purchase.

FanTasia 2006 (10th edition/10th anniversary)
Fantsasia's 10th anniversary and 10th edition, the 2006 edition, is the first to feature free outdoor shows. The outdoors shows are at Parc de la Paix and are free. Outdoor projections included films from the previous editions: Kamikaze Girls, the last four episodes of Goldorak, Night of the Living Dorks and Attack the Gas Station. The indoor shows use the same Concordia University facilities as since the move to Concordia. The outdoor shows are several kilometres away from the indoor shows. With its 10th anniversary, Fantasia helped to launch an associated but separate Toronto festival Toronto After Dark Film Festival.

FanTasia 2007
This edition was held from July 5 to July 23, 2007 at the Concordia University. In addition to the Hall hall and DeSeve hall, a third screening room has been added at the D.B. Clarke Theatre. There were, however, no outdoor shows this year. Montreal film Flutter received the award for best Quebec short feature.

Fantasia 2008
This edition was held from July 3 to July 21, 2008. It featured the world premieres of Pig Hunt, Home Movie, Repo! The Genetic Opera, Midnight Meat Train, Eric Shapiro's Rule of Three, Truffe, Treevenge, The Facts in the Case of Mister Hollow, Electric Fence, Paradox Mary, Laura Panic, and Don't Worry.

Fantasia 2009
The films screened at Fantasia 2009 were, among others, Thirst, Love Exposure, Embodiment of Evil, Vampire Girl vs. Frankenstein Girl, Smash Cut, Trick 'r Treat, Neighbor, Must Love Death, Cencoroll and Dread. The festival started on July 9 with Takashi Miike's film Yatterman and ended on July 29, 2009 with the North American premiere of Quentin Tarantino's film Inglourious Basterds.

Fantasia 2010
The films for Fantasia 2010 were announced on Tuesday, June 29, 2010. Tickets went on sale on July 6, 2010 at 1 pm. The Festival started on July 8, 2010 running until July 28, 2010 with 6 indoor screening venues and one outdoor location. For 2010 a permanent blog was introduced to communicate with fans year-round.

Fantasia 2011
Fantasia 2011 opened the 2011 edition of the festival with the Canadian Premiere of Red State. The festival also featured the presentation to John Landis of a lifetime Achievement award. The Canadian premiere of the director's new film, Burke and Hare also took place.  Also notable was the world premiere of the Swedish horror film Marianne, which some had hailed as one of the great discoveries in genre cinema of 2011. The world premiere of Final Destination 5 was part of Fantasia 15.

Canadian premiere films
 Burke and Hare
 Red State
 The Wicker Tree
 Absentia
 Morituris

World premiere films
 Aversion
 Brawler
 Curse of Chucky
 Deadball
 The Devil's Rock
 Exit
 Final Destination 5
 If a Tree Falls
 Love
 Marianne
 Rabies
 Retreat
 The Theatre Bizarre
 What Fun We Were Having: 4 Stories About Date Rape
 The Whisperer in Darkness
 Zombie Hunter

Fantasia 2012
Fantasia 2012 featured the screenings of the films Toad Road, Doomsday Book, the horror anthology film V/H/S, Hidden in the Woods (original version), Seediq Bale, and Quentin Dupieux's Wrong.

Fantasia 2014
The Creeping Garden was one of the featured films in the 2014 Festival.

Fantasia 2021
The 25th edition of the festival was held from 5 August to 25 August 2021. James Gunn’s The Suicide Squad was presented as a special event screening on 4 August.
 Opening film: The Suicide Squad
 Closing film: The Great Yokai War: Guardians
Awardees

 Cheval Noir Competition-Best Film Award: Voice of Silence by Hong Eui-jeong
 Cheval Noir Competition-Best Actor Award: Yoo Ah-in

Fantasia 2022
The 26th edition of the festival was held from 14 July to 3 August 2022. In the festival over 130 features and 200 shorts were screened. The highlight of the festival was honouring John Woo, the Hong Kong-based filmmaker, with the Career Achievement Award.
 Opening film: Polaris by K C Carthew
 Closing film: Next Sohee
Awardees

 Cheval Noir Competition-Best Film Award: Megalomaniac by Karim Ouelhaj
 Cheval Noir Competition-Best Director Award: Jung Ju-ri for Next Sohee
 Audience Award, International Feature: The Artifice Girl, Franklin Ritch (gold); La Pieta, Eduardo Casanova (silver); Deadstream, Joseph and Vanessa Winter (bronze).
 Audience Award, Canadian Feature: The Fight Machine, Andrew Thomas Hunt (gold); Cult Hero, Jesse T. Cook (silver); Relax, I'm from the Future, Luke Higginson (bronze).
 Audience Award, Quebec: Nut Jobs (Les Pas d'allure), Alexandre Leblanc (gold); Bright Star, Raphaël Hébert (silver); La Guêpe, Marc Beaupré
 Audience Award, Asian Feature: The Roundup, Lee Sang-yong (gold); Next Sohee, Jung Ju-ri (silver); One for the Road, Nattawut Poonpiriya (bronze).
 Audience Award, Animated Feature: Princess Dragon, Anthony Roux and Jean-Jacques Denis (gold); Inu-Oh, Masaaki Yuasa (silver); Chun Tae-il: A Flame That Lives On, Jun-pyo Hong (bronze).
 Audience Award, Documentary: The Pez Outlaw, Amy Bandlien Storkel and Bryan Storkel (gold); Que le fan soit avec toi, Marc Joly-Corcoran (silver); Out in the Ring, Ry Levey (bronze).

Video publications of Fantasia

 Small Gauge Trauma
 Small Gauge Trauma is the name of the film shorts component of Fantasia. A DVD anthology of various shorts shown over various editions of Fantasia has been published.

Red to Kill
 Fantasia has published a subtitled VHS version of the Hong Kong film Red to Kill, for release in Quebec.

 Run and Kill
 Fantasia has published a subtitled VHS version of the Hong Kong film Run and Kill, for release in Quebec.

 Jackie Chan's Greatest Stunts
 Fantasia has published a subtitled VHS version of the Hong Kong action scenes compilation Jackie Chan's Greatest Stunts Volumes 1 & 2, for release in Quebec.

 Jackie Chan: My Stunts
 Fantasia has published a subtitled VHS version of Jackie Chan's stunt action compilation My Stunts, for release in Quebec.

 Jackie Chan: My Story
 Fantasia has published a subtitled VHS version of Jackie Chan's autobiography My Story, for release in Quebec.

 Trailer DVD
 For the 2008, 2007, 2006, 2005, and 2003 festivals, a DVD filled with trailers of some of the films being played has been provided for purchase.

See also
 Montreal World Film Festival
 Festival du Nouveau Cinéma
 Festival International de Films de Montréal
 European Fantastic Film Festivals Federation
 Neuchatel International Fantastic Film Festival, another festival with a dual focus on fantasy and Asian cinema

Other genre film festivals
 Brussels International Festival of Fantasy Film
 Bucheon International Fantastic Film Festival
 Fantastic Fest
 Fantafestival
 Fantasporto
 Lost Episode Festival Toronto
 Screamfest Horror Film Festival
 Sitges Film Festival
 TromaDance

References

External links
 Fantasia official website
 Asia featured at Montreal fest

Film festivals in Montreal
Fantasy and horror film festivals in Canada
Film festivals established in 1996
Annual events in Canada
1996 establishments in Quebec
Science fiction film festivals